Abayomi Owope (born 17 December 1977) is a Nigerian writer, TV presenter and communications specialist. He is the founder of the yearly conference Women in Journalism and CEO of NXTGEN, a youth platform.

He was the co-host of the TV show Wake Up Nigeria on TVC News from 2017 - 2020.

Early life and education
Yomi had his elementary and secondary school education in Kaduna, Nigeria after which he proceeded to obtain a degree in English from the University of Lagos and later, a master's degree in communications from the Pan Atlantic University.

Career
Yomi Owope was a writer at one of Nigeria's leading dailies, Thisday between 2001 and 2003 and joined PR agency Sesema PR in Lagos, receiving PR training under the late Alima Atta. In 2004, he became Press Secretary to the Wife of the Governor of Kwara State, Mrs Toyin Saraki, a role he held till 2008 when he moved to television. 
 
In 2009, he wrote and hosted the first season of the television show, "The Debaters" and signed another contract to write and host the second season of the show in 2010. He then wrote two seasons of Africa's first syndicated talk show, "Moments with Mo" starting in 2010 and completing 40 episodes by 2011. Owope is the writer and voice narrator of the "Next Titan Reality Show"

In 2013, Owope began working with the School of Media and Communications at the Pan Atlantic University, and UNESCO, to try to improve the standard of journalism in Africa. He then initiated Women in Journalism, a conference of women journalists in Lagos, Nigeria. The global Conference has held five times, in 2014, 2015, 2016, 2017 and 2019.

In 2013 he received an Innovation Award for leadership and for founding the Debate and Speech Society at the Pan Atlantic University in Lagos.

In July, 2017, he joined TVC as host of Wake Up Nigeria alongside Titi Oyinsan.

In October, 2021, Owope was appointed senior special assistant to the Ogun State Governor, Dapo Abiodun.

Personal life
Yomi Owope is happily married to Ayotunde and they have three children.

References

Male journalists
1977 births
Living people
Nigerian newspaper journalists
Nigerian television presenters
Yoruba television personalities
University of Lagos alumni
Pan-Atlantic University alumni
Television personalities from Lagos
Yoruba journalists